The 1944 United States presidential election in Arizona took place on November 7, 1944, as part of the 1944 United States presidential election. State voters chose four representatives, or electors, to the Electoral College, who voted for president and vice president.

Arizona was won by incumbent President Franklin D. Roosevelt (D–New York), running with Senator Harry S. Truman, with 58.80% of the popular vote, against Governor Thomas Dewey (R–New York), running with Governor John W. Bricker, with 40.90% of the popular vote. This is the last time a Democrat won Arizona with a double digit margin of victory.

Results

Results by county

References

Arizona
1944
1944 Arizona elections